The 2015 Garden Open was a professional tennis tournament played on clay courts. It was the seventh edition of the tournament which was part of the 2015 ATP Challenger Tour. It took place in Rome, Italy between 4 and 9 May 2015.

Singles main-draw entrants

Seeds

 1 Rankings are as of April 27, 2015.

Other entrants
The following players received wildcards into the singles main draw:
  Filippo Baldi 
  Marco Cecchinato
  Andrey Rublev
  Lorenzo Sonego

The following players received entry as a special exempt to gain entry into the main draw:
  Adam Pavlásek

The following players received entry from the qualifying draw:
  Karen Khachanov
  Pedro Cachín
  Flavio Cipolla
  Matteo Berrettini

The following player received entry as a lucky loser:
  Stefano Travaglia

Doubles main-draw entrants

Seeds

1 Rankings as of April 28, 2015.

Other entrants 
The following pairs received wildcards into the doubles main draw:
  Giulio Di Meo /  Potito Starace
  Lorenzo Sonego /  Stefano Travaglia
  Filippo Baldi /  Matteo Berrettini

Champions

Singles

 Aljaž Bedene def.  Adam Pavlásek 7−5, 6−2

Doubles

  Dustin Brown /  František Čermák  def.  Andrés Molteni /  Marco Trungelliti, 6–1, 6–2

External links
Official Website

Garden Open
Garden Open
Garden